The Children's Museum is a rural non-profit corporation and is run by staff, volunteer committees, and a Board of Directors. It is located in Bloomsburg, Columbia County, Pennsylvania. It opened in May, 1985.

References

External links

Bloomsburg–Berwick metropolitan area
Children's museums in Pennsylvania